Hernán Jesús Garrido Lecca Montañez (born May 18, 1960) is a Peruvian economist, writer, producer, inventor and politician. A popular children's literature author in Peru, he is most recognized by his work Pirates in Callao, which was adapted into the first CGI motion picture in Peruvian cinematography. At political level, he is a member of the Peruvian Aprista Party, serving in Alan García's second administration as cabinet minister, from 2006 to 2008.

Garrido Lecca graduated from the University of the Pacific with a major in economics. Subsequently, he attended Harvard Kennedy School and Massachusetts Institute of Technology, obtaining a Master's in Public Administration and a Master's of Science in Technology and Policy, respectively. He attained a PhD in Applied Economics at the University of Seville. His interest in literature led him to complete the master's program in Peruvian and Latin American Literature at the National University of San Marcos. He holds the rank of Major of the Peruvian Army (Reserve), and is a Private Pilot.

After working in radio and television journalism in different media for more during the 1990s and publishing books in the fields of economics, science and technology, and consumer advocacy, Garrido Lecca entered politics by running for the Peruvian Congress at the 2001 general election with Union for Peru. Although not elected, he was recruited in the Peruvian Aprista Party as an advisor to former president Alan García. He was subsequently named the party's campaign manager for the 2006 general election.

At the start of the second presidency of Alan García in July 2006, Garrido Lecca was appointed Minister of Housing, Construction and Sanitation. In December 2007, he was rotated in the cabinet as Minister of Health. He resigned on October 14, 2008, amid the 2008 oil scandal, which led Alan García to sack his entire cabinet. Garrido Lecca was signaled as part of the scheme leading to the scandal, and currently remains under investigation alongside other former members of the administration.

References

21st-century Peruvian politicians
Peruvian inventors
Peruvian writers
20th-century Peruvian economists
University of Seville alumni
National University of San Marcos alumni
Massachusetts Institute of Technology alumni
Harvard Kennedy School alumni
1960 births
Living people
American Popular Revolutionary Alliance politicians
People from Lima